The 1987 United States rugby union tour of Wales was a series of six matches played by the United States national rugby union team in Wales in October and November 1987. The United States team won two of their six matches, and lost the other four, including the international match against the Wales national rugby union team.
The "Eagles" lost also a test against Canada, played returning home.
7

Matches 
Scores and results list United States's points tally first.

References

Rugby union tours of Wales
United States national rugby union team tours
United States
1987–88 in Welsh rugby union
1987 in American sports